The Hayden Building is a historic building at 681-683 Washington Street in Boston, Massachusetts.

The building was built in 1875 and added to the National Register of Historic Places in 1980 as well as designated a Boston Landmark in 1977  Designed to act as commercial retail space, this four story brownstone building shows little of the ornamentation generally associated with Henry Hobson Richardson.  It is the last surviving commercial retail building designed by Richardson in Boston. The building is in Boston's Chinatown neighborhood.

Description
The five story Richardsonian Romanesque building was built on a very narrow lot. It is constructed of Longmeadow brownstone and is sparsely detailed with granite lintels and arches.

Background
This building was not recorded as a Henry Hobson Richardson building until work done by architectural and landscape historian Cynthia Zaitzevsky made note of it in 1973.

Previous summaries of Richardson's works relied on office books.  This building was built by the Richardson family and was not charged an architectural or design fee.  This building replaced a drugstore that exploded on this site in 1875.

All other commercial buildings designed by Richardson in Boston have been demolished.

Restoration
Historic Boston Incorporated acquired the building in 1995 and completed a total exterior restoration to repair fire damage. Work was done by the architectural firm Bruner/Cott and Preservation Carpentry students at the North Bennet Street School.  Damaged structural stonework was replaced using latex molded cast stone replicas from other parts of the building. Brownstone lintels and columns were replaced where necessary.

In 2011, Boston architectural firm CUBE design + research was commissioned to complete a comprehensive restoration and conversion into multi-family housing.

See also
National Register of Historic Places listings in northern Boston, Massachusetts
Combat Zone, Boston

References

External links
"The Hayden Building", Historic Boston.
"Hayden Building", Atlas Obscura.

 "Hayden building", Massachusetts Historical Commission, 1978, OpenLibrary.org.
The Hayden Building official site
 City of Boston,Boston Landmarks CommissionHayden Building Study Report

Commercial buildings on the National Register of Historic Places in Massachusetts
Commercial buildings completed in 1875
Henry Hobson Richardson buildings
Richardsonian Romanesque architecture in Massachusetts
Buildings and structures in Boston
National Register of Historic Places in Boston
Landmarks in Chinatown, Boston